Arthur "Bucky" Maughan is an American wrestler.  He is a distinguished member of the National Wrestling Hall of Fame
and former head coach of the wrestling team at North Dakota State University in Fargo, North Dakota, where he has been head coach since 1964.  He has coached four national championship teams: in 1988, 1998, 2000 and 2001. During his collegiate career, he won three national wrestling titles. He was the NCAA champion at 115 pounds in 1963 for Moorhead State University and also won the NAIA 123 pound championship in 1962 and 1963.  On May 17, 2011, Bucky announced his retirement.

References 

Year of birth missing (living people)
Living people
North Dakota State Bison wrestling coaches
Minnesota State–Moorhead Dragons wrestlers
American male sport wrestlers